Kim Michael Hirschovits-Gerz (born 9 May 1982) is a Finnish former professional ice hockey forward and  sports manager of Kiekko-Espoo in the Mestis. During his playing career, he skated in the Finnish Liiga (called SM-liiga until 2013) with HIFK, Jokerit, the Espoo Blues, and Oulun Kärpät; in the Swedish Elitserien with Timrå IK and Luleå HF; and in the Kontinental Hockey League (KHL) with Torpedo Nizhny Novgorod and Dinamo Minsk. Hirschovits was drafted by the New York Rangers as their sixth-round pick, 194th overall, in the 2002 NHL Entry Draft.

Following his retirement in 2019, Hirschovits stepped into role as sports manager Kiekko-Espoo. He also served as the team's head coach during the 2019–20 season and 2021–22 season.

Playing career
Hirschovits started his professional playing career with HIFK in the 2000–01 SM-liiga season, but his career took off in the 2005–06 season, when he scored 40 points. Hirschovits then created controversy by signing with HIFK's local rival Jokerit, following in the footsteps of coach Doug Shedden. Hirschovits's career included a brief visit to North America in 2002, when he played six games with the Chicago Steel of the United States Hockey League (USHL).

In September 2006, he was the SM-liiga Player of the Month. In the 2008–09 season he led the SM-liiga in assists (48) and points (Veli-Pekka Ketola Trophy; 66) and was the January 2009 SM-liiga Player of the Month. In the 2014–15 season, he was named the Liiga Best Player of the regular season (Lasse Oksanen Trophy), won the Liiga Golden Helmet, led the Liiga in assists (45) and points (Veli-Pekka Ketola Trophy; 58), and was the February 2015 Liiga Player of the Month.

International play
Hirschovits made his international debut on Team Finland on the Euro Hockey Tour's Moscow tournament in December 2006.

Career statistics

Regular season and playoffs

International

Records
 Recorded six assists in an SM-liiga game (January 9, 2007), a Jokerit club record. The league record, seven assists, dates back to 1982 and is held by Matti Forss.

See also
List of select Jewish ice hockey players

References

External links
 
  

1982 births
Living people
Finnish ice hockey centres
Ice hockey people from Helsinki
Chicago Steel players
HC Dinamo Minsk players
Espoo United players
Finnish Jews
HIFK (ice hockey) players
Jewish ice hockey players
Jokerit players
Luleå HF players
New York Rangers draft picks
Oulun Kärpät players
Timrå IK players
Torpedo Nizhny Novgorod players